Agfa produced a number of mostly consumer-oriented digital cameras from the mid-1990s to the early 2000s.

Agfa StudioCam (1995) (professional digital camera, first ever to be produced and sold in quantity)
Agfa ActionCam (1995) (Professional/prosumer DSLR)
Agfa ePhoto 1280 (1997) (0.7 megapixel, used SmartMedia)
Agfa ePhoto 1680 (1998)(1.2 mp)
Agfa ePhoto CL50 (1999) (1.2 mp)
Agfa ePhoto CL30 (1999,  0.9 mp, used CompactFlash)
Agfa ePhoto CL30 Clik! (1999, 0.9 mp, uses Iomega Clik! (later renamed PocketZip) disks as memory card)
Agfa ePhoto CL18 (2000) (0.3 mp)
Agfa ePhoto CL45 (2001) (0.7 mp)
Agfa ePhoto CL20
Agfa ePhoto CL34
Agfa ePhoto 307  (1997)
Agfa ePhoto 780
Agfa ePhoto 780c
Agfa ePhoto Smile (0.3 mp)

See also
List of digital camera brands
Microdrive

External links
Edgereview review of Agfa ePhoto CL30 Clik! (September 2000)
Pcworld review of Agfa ePhoto CL30 Clik! (March 2000)
Agfa cameras with sample photos at PBbase